Alfred Roy Le Messurier (19 February 1886 – 5 October 1946) was an Australian rules footballer and businessman.

Family
The son of Alfred Le Messurier, and Jane Sinclair Le Messurier, née Neill, Alfred Roy Le Messurier was born at Semaphore, South Australia on 19 February 1886.

He married Margaret Galway Saunders (-1970), at Semaphore, on 17 April 1912.

Education
He was educated at Semaphore Collegiate School and at the Collegiate School of St Peter.

Employment
At 16, Roy entered his father's shipping agency, A. & E. Le Messurier, where he specialized in importing timber from Tasmania for local furniture-makers and developed it into a significant enterprise.

Football
He played for Port Adelaide before the family moved to North Adelaide in 1908, and he qualified for the North Adelaide team under the electorate system. He played at North Adelaide from 1908–09 and 1910–13, playing 46 games and kicking 4 goals.

He played for South Australia at the 1908 Jubilee Australasian Football Carnival held in Melbourne.

His younger brother, Frederick Neill Le Messurier (1891-1966), also played with North Adelaide from 1908–10 and 1913–14 (playing with the Adelaide University Football Club from 1911–12).

Le Messurier later re-joined Port Adelaide as a committeeman.

Death
He died at Fitzroy, South Australia on 5 October 1946.

See also
 1908 Melbourne Carnival

Footnotes

References
 Jubilee of Australian Football: The Interstate Teams: The South Australian Team, The Leader, (Saturday, 29 August 1908), p.29.

External links

 Australian Dictionary of Biography
 Past Players: Le Messurier, Alfred Roy, North Adelaide Football Club.
 Roy "Teddy" Le Messurier, australianfootball.com.

1886 births
1946 deaths
Australian rules footballers from South Australia
Port Adelaide Football Club (SANFL) players
Port Adelaide Football Club players (all competitions)
North Adelaide Football Club players